Dato' Mohd Zaid bin Ibrahim (Jawi: محمد زيد بن إبراهيم; born 10 April 1951) is a Malaysian politician, lawyer and former Minister in the Prime Minister's Department for Legal Affairs and Judicial Reform (March 2008-September 2008). He was previously a Senator in the Dewan Negara, the upper chamber of the Parliament of Malaysia.

He was a member of the United Malays National Organisation (UMNO), before being suspended on 2 December 2008. UMNO is part of the ruling Barisan Nasional coalition which he joined in 2000. He was the Member of Parliament for Kota Bharu from 2004 to 2008. He is also the founder of Zaid Ibrahim & Co., the largest private law firm in Malaysia. Presently he is a member of United Malays National Organisation (UMNO), a component of Barisan Nasional (BN) coalition.

Early life and legal career
Born in Kota Bharu, Kelantan, Zaid went to Sultan Ismail College, Kota Bharu before started his law studies in Universiti Teknologi Mara, Shah Alam (or Institut Teknologi Mara as it was known then) by taking his LL.B (Hons.) External Programme which was conducted by the University of London. Upon graduating from ITM, he went to London and was accepted as a Barrister-at-Law, Inner Temple. In 1987 he founded Zaid Ibrahim & Co., which as of 2008 is the largest law firm in Malaysia with over 140 lawyers.

Early membership with UMNO
In 2000, he joined UMNO, becoming Kota Bharu UMNO division chief a year later. He was later suspended but became Kelantan Umno deputy lion chief two years later. Zaid contested and won the Parliamentary seat of Kota Bharu in the 2004 general election. However, UMNO dropped him as a candidate in the 2008 general election. It suffered heavy losses, including the 2/3 majority necessary in the Dewan Rakyat to pass amendments to the Constitution.

Zaid is known for his criticism of the government's handling of legal issues such as the judiciary, human rights and Islamic law. He supported the establishment of the Royal Commission of Inquiry into the Lingam Video Clip, criticising the government's initial response to the clip, which allegedly revealed fixing of judicial decisions and graft in the judiciary.

As minister
When the then Prime Minister Tun Abdullah Ahmad Badawi reshuffled his Cabinet after the just concluded 2008 general election, he appointed Zaid as a Minister in the Prime Minister's Department to oversee legal affairs and judicial reform. He was previously dropped from defending his seat as Member of Parliament for Kota Bharu which he won in 2004.

Zaid succeeded Datuk Seri Mohamed Nazri Abdul Aziz, who had previously held the portfolio, but as of 2008 continues to be a Minister in the Prime Minister's Department tasked with parliamentary affairs. Zaid was also appointed as senator to the Dewan Negara on 18 March so he could take up his Cabinet posting. His appointment was greeted by The Economist as the "most promising" in the new Cabinet.

His appointment as Minister in the Prime Minister's Department in charge of reforming the judiciary, which has been riddled with scandals, especially following the Royal Commission of Inquiry into the Lingam Video Clip, is seen as an attempt by then Prime Minister Tun Abdullah Ahmad Badawi to weed out corruption and instill public respect and confidence in the judiciary.

Following his appointment as a Minister, Zaid resigned from all his posts in Zaid Ibrahim & Co., and relinquished his shares in the company. He was replaced as chairman by Nik Norzul Thani, who said the firm was implementing a succession plan they drew up after Zaid's election in 2004.

Within days of his appointment as Minister, Zaid stated that the government had to openly apologise for its handling of the 1988 Judicial Crisis, which saw the sacking of the then Lord President of the Supreme Court, Tun Salleh Abas, from his seat. Zaid called it one of his three main goals: "In the eyes of the world, the judicial crisis has weakened our judiciary system." However, he rejected the idea of reviewing the decision: "I am not suggesting that we re-open the case. I am saying that it’s clear to everyone, to the world, that serious transgressions had been committed by the previous administration. And I believe that the prime minister is big enough and man enough to say that we had done wrong to these people and we are sorry."

The Bar Council welcomed the proposal. Newly appointed Domestic Trade and Consumer Affairs Minister Datuk Shahrir Abdul Samad also voiced support: "The Government has apologised for so many other things to the people, such as the untimely destruction of temples and other issues. So, why not an apology to a former Lord President?"

2008: Resignation from the Cabinet
After criticising the arrests of three prominent individuals—Democratic Action Party MP Teresa Kok, blogger Raja Petra Kamaruddin, and journalist Tan Hoon Cheng—under the Internal Security Act, Zaid resigned from the Cabinet on 15 September 2008.

Zaid Ibrahim urged the Yang di-Pertuan Agong not to appoint Datuk Seri Najib Tun Razak as Prime Minister of Malaysia, and instead appoint someone else from UMNO. He pointed out Najib has been linked on the internet and by political rivals to the brutal murder of Altantuya Shaariibuu. Zaid also cited the RM400 million in commissions reportedly paid by the Defence Ministry while Najib was minister for the procurement of submarines, and pointed out that Abdul Razak Baginda, Najib's friend, was an agent in the deal. This was after Tun Dr. Mahathir Mohamad, the former Prime Minister also said that Najib did not shine as a deputy prime minister and stated that Najib carried a lot of baggage into the Prime Minister's job.

Political career after 2009

2009-2010: Joining Parti Keadilan Rakyat
In June 2009 Zaid joined the opposition Parti Keadilan Rakyat (PKR). As part of the Pakatan Rakyat opposition alliance, Zaid was appointed to head the coalition's Common Policy Framework group where he was responsible for formulating a common manifesto and governing policy between the three disparate political parties (PKR, PAS, DAP) that made up the loose opposition alliance. He also headed efforts, in his role as Pakatan coordinator and pro-tem committee chairman of Pakatan Rakyat Malaysia, to register Pakatan Rakyat as an official political coalition party with Malaysia's Registrar of Societies on 3 November 2009. During the Hulu Selangor by-election in April 2010, Zaid was also fielded as the PKR candidate, but was narrowly defeated by P. Kamalanathan of the Malaysian Indian Congress.

In the 2010 PKR party elections, Zaid Ibrahim contested for the party post of Deputy President after having received over 30 nominations. He confirmed his candidacy in a posting on his blog on 16 October 2010. However, in Nov 2010, Zaid Ibrahim withdrew his candidacy as a sign of protest against serious allegations of fraud and electoral misconduct perpetrated in the PKR party elections by his opponent, the PKR establishment candidate Azmin Ali. He subsequently resigned from the party, citing his loss of confidence in the PKR party leadership for their involvement in the electoral fraud of the 2010 party elections.

2010-2012: Founding KITA
On 13 December 2010, the Malaysian Human's Justice Front (AKIM), a tiny Kelantan-based opposition party, announced that Zaid Ibrahim has joined its ranks as a party member, with the view of having Zaid lead and revamp AKIM into a viable political party for the coming 13th Malaysian General Elections. The party further explained that Zaid had submitted his membership application to join AKIM in Nov 2010 after his former party, PKR, accepted Zaid's resignation.

During the party's annual general meeting on 15 December 2010, Zaid Ibrahim was elected as the party's new president, taking over from Zakaria Salleh, the outgoing president of AKIM. The party also announced that it had adopted a new name, the People's Welfare Party or Parti Kesejahteraan Insan Tanah Air (KITA). Zaid Ibrahim also announced that KITA would be a multi-racial democratic party open to all races in Malaysia, and despite its current small size, aims to make an impact in the country's political scene by focusing on goals for the long haul. Zaid also unveiled the KITA's official party ideology and principles, including its new constitution, manifesto, and logo, in Kuala Lumpur on 19 January 2011. Zaid resigned as KITA chief in 2012.

2012-2017: Becoming an Independent
In 2014, after stating that the lack of religious discourse by the religious leaders in Malaysia that does not allow for different interpretations of Islam promotes extremism and makes Malaysia similar to the Islamic State of Iraq and Syria, he was criticised by Islamic scholar Fathul Bari Mat Jahya for being a liberal who only wanted to follow civil laws and not those created by Allah and that it is the responsibility of the Ulema to specifically identify what is wajib (obligatory), halal (allowed), and haram (prohibited).

2017-2020: Joining Democratic Action Party
In 2017, Zaid had announced in a press conference in his Petaling Jaya home that he has officially joined the Democratic Action Party, reasoning that "he will be able to reach out to Malay voters".

On 20 April 2020, Zaid had announced he leave DAP.

On 20 October 2020, Zaid is no longer Kelantan DAP Chairman. He said "Many still describe me as Kelantan DAP chief. It's no longer true,...".

2022-present: Returning To UMNO
In August 2022, Zaid Ibrahim return to UMNO. He said "I want UMNO because I feel that they can provide that solidarity. They can provide that energy and the strength to bring everybody else on board and institute real reform in this country..."

On 16 September 2022, Zaid rejoins UMNO. He said he wants to reform the party from “within”.

Personal life
Zaid is married to Datin Suliana Shamsuddin Alias and the couple have three children. In 2008, he was one of four Malaysians named by Forbes in its list of generous and interesting philanthropists in Asia, for starting the Kelantan Foundation for the Disabled in 1998. The foundation provides free counselling services, physiotherapy, transportation and home visits to 2,400 disabled individuals from Zaid's home state of Kelantan, who are suffering from Down syndrome, cerebral palsy, blindness and other disabilities.

Election results

Honours
 :
 Companion Class I of the Exalted Order of Malacca (DMSM) - Datuk (2003)

References

External links
Official Blog

 

1951 births
Living people
People from Kota Bharu
People from Kelantan
Malaysian people of Malay descent
Malaysian Muslims
20th-century Malaysian lawyers
Malaysian political party founders
United Malays National Organisation politicians
Former People's Justice Party (Malaysia) politicians
Former Democratic Action Party (Malaysia) politicians
People's Welfare Party (Malaysia) politicians
Independent politicians in Malaysia
Government ministers of Malaysia
Members of the Dewan Negara
Members of the Dewan Rakyat
Alumni of the University of London
21st-century Malaysian politicians